Sayetkon is a village in Homalin Township, Hkamti District, in the Sagaing Region of northwestern Burma. Sayethkon lies on the Chindwin River, to the north of Nampagan.

References

External links
Maplandia World Gazetteer

Populated places in Hkamti District
Homalin Township